The Dagoman are a group of Indigenous Australians living in the Northern Territory of Australia.

Language
The Dagoman language was one of the non-Pama–Nyungan languages, closely related to its congeners, Wardaman and Yangman. All three may be considered to be dialects of the one language isolate. The language is extinct, the last known speaker being Mrs Martha Hart of Pine Creek, who died in 1982. There is a considerable overlap of vocabulary and typological features with Wakiman.

Country
Dagoman country lay to the north of that of the Wardaman people, while its borders with those of the Jawoyn were at Kumbidgee by the water-hole of the rock bat (Wallan, in Jawoyn legend), along the old north-south road running from Maranboy to Katherine.
They were also present at Jindare.

According to Nolgoyma, an elderly headman, one of the remnant of Dagoman survivors, their land's extent was as follows:
The long axis stretch(es) from the Ferguson River and the lower King across the valley of the lower Edith and Katherine (sic) river to the headwaters  of the Roper River. It straddles the watershed between the Indian Ocean and the Gulf of Carpentaria.- The key site of the northwest extremity was a place called Bamboo Creek on the Ferguson River where the supplies of bamboo spear shafts were obtained. This was quite definitely Tagoman property and their rights probably did extend somewhat beyond this point as Tindale indicates. Also Edith for axe heads. The key site at the southeast end of the territory was Leach Lagoon which drains into Roper Creek. This was the Turtle Dreaming place and the source of pipey (?) timber for didgeridoos... The waterholes at Oluydune Dyrinyan and Wongalla (Wangala) on the King River were also in Tagoman territory.. The SW limit of the territory was fixed by the right bank of the Katherine river from the Ferguson junction upstream at least as far as the Limestone Creek junction.

People
W. Arndt, an agricultural research officer stationed in Katherine, came across an elderly Dagoman in the 1950s, in taking down notes, had the impression he was recording a people who had hitherto been overlooked in the ethnographic literature who died in the late 1950s. He made a brief report on their use of indigenous cereals for the journal Oceania in 1961, disclosing that this was part of a manuscript he had prepared, but not yet published, entitled "Recognition of the Previous Existence, Industry, Mythology and Rock Art of the Tagoman in the Katherine District, Northern territory".

Sorghum
Three varieties of indigenous Sorghum seed were gathered as foodstuffs by the Dagoman, Sorghum plumosum, Sorghum intrans  and Sorghum macrospermum.

Notes

Citations

Sources

Aboriginal peoples of the Northern Territory